Maurice Rouvier (17 April 1842 – 7 June 1911) was a French statesman of the "Opportunist" faction, who served as the Prime Minister of France. He is best known for his financial policies and his unpopular policies designed to avoid a rupture with Germany.

Career
He was born in Aix-en-Provence, and spent his early career in business at Marseille.  He supported Léon Gambetta's candidature there in 1867, and in 1870 he founded an anti-imperial journal, L'Egalité. He also belonged to the same masonic lodge as Gambetta, "La Réforme" in Marseille. Becoming secretary general of the prefecture of Bouches-du-Rhône in. 1870–71, he refused the office of prefect. In July 1871 he was returned to the National Assembly for Marseille at a by-election, and voted steadily with the Republican party. He became a recognized authority on finance, and repeatedly served on the Budget Commission as reporter or president.

At the general elections of 1881 after the fall of the Jules Ferry cabinet he was returned to the chamber on a programme which included the separation of Church and State, a policy of decentralization, and the imposition of an income-tax. He then joined Gambetta's cabinet as minister of commerce and the colonies, and in the 1883-85 cabinet of Jules Ferry he held the same office. He became premier and minister of finance on 31 May 1887, with the support of the moderate republican groups, the Radicals holding aloof in support of General Boulanger, who began a violent agitation against the government.

Then came the scandal of the decorations in which President Grévy's son-in-law Daniel Wilson figured, and the Rouvier cabinet fell in its attempt to screen the president. Rouvier's opposition in his capacity of president of the Budget Commission was one of the causes of the defeat of Charles Floquet's cabinet in February 1889. In the new Tirard ministry formed to combat the Boulangist agitation, he was minister of finance. He kept the same post in the Freycinet, Loubet and Ribot cabinets of 1890–93. Accusations that he accepted bribes from Cornelius Herz and the baron de Reinach compelled his resignation from the Ribot cabinet during the Panama scandals in December 1892.  He became a successful banker and was known for his thorough familiarity with financial and budgetary issues.

Prime minister
Again, in 1902, he became minister of finance, after nearly ten years in exclusion from office, in the Radical cabinet of Émile Combes; and on the fall of the Combes ministry in January 1905 he was invited by the president to form a new ministry. In this cabinet he at first held the ministry of finance. In his initial declaration to the chamber the new premier had declared his intention of continuing the policy of the late cabinet, pledging the new ministry to a policy of conciliation, to the consideration of old age pensions, an income-tax, separation of Church and State. Under a law passed in April 1905, for instance, a certain credit was earmarked in the French budget for the purpose of public subsidies for unemployment benefit funds.

Foreign policy
Public attention, however, was chiefly concentrated on foreign policy. During the Combes ministry Theophile Delcassé had come to a secret understanding with Spain on the Moroccan question, and had established an understanding with Britain. His policy had aroused German jealousy, which became evident in the asperity with which the question of Morocco was handled in Berlin.

At a cabinet meeting on 5 June Rouvier reproached the Foreign Minister with imprudence over Morocco, and after a heated discussion Delcassé resigned.  Rouvier himself took the portfolio of foreign affairs at this crucial point. After critical negotiations, he secured on 8 July an agreement with Germany accepting the international conference proposed by the sultan of Morocco on the assurance that Germany would recognize the special nature of the interest of France in maintaining order on the frontier of her Algerian empire. Lengthy discussions resulted in a new convention in September, which contained the programme of the proposed conference, and in December Rouvier was able to make a statement of the whole proceedings in the chamber, which received the assent of all parties.  Rouvier's government did not long survive the presidential election of 1906.

Church and state
In 1905, the government introduced the law on the separation of Church and State, heavily supported by Emile Combes, who had been strictly enforcing the 1901 voluntary association law and the 1904 law on religious congregations' freedom of teaching (more than 2,500 private teaching establishments were by then closed by the State, causing bitter opposition from the Catholic and conservative population). On 10 February 1905, the Chamber declared that "the attitude of the Vatican" had rendered the separation of Church and State inevitable and the law of the separation of church and state was passed in December, 1905.  The disturbances arising in connection with the Separation Law were skillfully handled by Georges Clemenceau to discredit the ministry, which gave place to a cabinet under the direction of Sarrien.
He died in Neuilly-sur-Seine.

Rouvier’s First Ministry, 30 May – 12 December 1887
Maurice Rouvier – President of the Council and Minister of Finance
Émile Flourens – Minister of Foreign Affairs
Théophile Adrien Ferron – Minister of War
Armand Fallières – Minister of the Interior
Charles Mazeau – Minister of Justice
Édouard Barbey – Minister of Marine and Colonies
Eugène Spuller – Minister of Public Instruction, Fine Arts, and Worship
François Barbé – Minister of Agriculture
Severiano de Heredia – Minister of Public Works
Lucien Dautresme – Minister of Commerce and Industry

Changes
30 November 1887 – Armand Fallières succeeds Mazeau as interim Minister of Justice, remaining also Minister of the Interior.

Rouvier's Second Ministry, 24 January 1905 – 13 March 1906

Maurice Rouvier - President of the Council and Minister of Finance
Théophile Delcassé - Minister of Foreign Affairs
Maurice Berteaux - Minister of War
Eugène Étienne - Minister of the Interior
Joseph Chaumié - Minister of Justice
Gaston Thomson - Minister of Marine
Jean-Baptiste Bienvenu-Martin - Minister of Public Instruction, Fine Arts, and Worship
Joseph Ruau - Minister of Agriculture
Étienne Clémentel - Minister of Colonies
Armand Gauthier de l'Aude - Minister of Public Works
Fernand Dubief - Minister of Commerce, Industry, Posts, and Telegraphs

Changes
6 June 1905 - Rouvier succeeds Delcassé as Minister of Foreign Affairs.
17 June 1905 - Pierre Merlou succeeds Rouvier as Minister of Finance.
12 November 1905 - Eugène Étienne succeeds Berteaux as Minister of War.  Fernand Dubief succeeds Étienne as Minister of the Interior. Georges Trouillot succeeds Dubief as Minister of Commerce, Industry, Posts, and Telegraphs

Cultural references
 Appears as a minor character in the historical-mystery novel Stone's Fall, by Iain Pears.

References

1842 births
1911 deaths
19th-century heads of state of France
People from Aix-en-Provence
Politicians from Provence-Alpes-Côte d'Azur
Republican Union (France) politicians
Democratic Republican Alliance politicians
Prime Ministers of France
French Ministers of Finance
French Ministers of Commerce and Colonies
French Ministers of Commerce
Members of the National Assembly (1871)
Members of the 1st Chamber of Deputies of the French Third Republic
Members of the 2nd Chamber of Deputies of the French Third Republic
Members of the 3rd Chamber of Deputies of the French Third Republic
Members of the 4th Chamber of Deputies of the French Third Republic
Members of the 5th Chamber of Deputies of the French Third Republic
Members of the 6th Chamber of Deputies of the French Third Republic
Members of the 7th Chamber of Deputies of the French Third Republic
Members of the 8th Chamber of Deputies of the French Third Republic
French Senators of the Third Republic
Senators of Alpes-Maritimes
French residents-general in Tunisia
French Freemasons